The Nanuk is a remote weapon station (RWS) used for light and medium calibre weapons which can be installed on any type of armoured vehicles or Brown water patrol vessel. It is designed by Rheinmetall Canada, in Quebec, Canada. The word Nanuk means "polar bear" in Inuktitut.

It is considered to be a third-generation weapon station.

Design
The Nanuk is a remotely-controlled weapon station that can be integrated on various armoured vehicle platforms and used for different mission profiles. The Nanuk weapon station combines full stabilisation, long range day/night all-weather sights and a universal weapon cradle that integrates 5.56 mm, 7.62 mm and 12.7 mm weapons, and 40 mm automatic grenade launchers.

Several weapons can be mounted to the platform, such as:
 M2 12.7 mm heavy machine gun
 M240/MAG-58 7.62 mm machine gun
 M249 (Minimi) 5.56 mm machine gun
 MG 3 7.62 mm machine gun
 MG4 5.56 mm machine gun
 MK19 40 mm grenade launcher
 Heckler & Koch GMG 40 mm grenade launcher
 CRV7 70 mm folding-fin ground attack rocket
 FGM-148 Javelin anti-tank guided missile
 AGM-114 Hellfire anti-tank guided missile

References

Remote weapon stations
Rheinmetall